The Casablanca Clock Tower is a clock tower in Casablanca, Morocco. Located in United Nations Square, the tower is a 1993 reproduction of one of the oldest French-built structures in the city. The original tower was built between 1908-1910 by the French commander Charles Martial Joseph Dessigny, as an identical copy of one he had built in Aïn Séfra when stationed there previously.

It was demolished May 1948. The current tower is an almost identical copy rebuilt nearby in 1993.

History 
The French Army commander Charles Martial Joseph Dessigny, then head of the French department of public facilities in the recently bombarded and occupied Casablanca, ordered the construction of the tower. It was completed between 1908-1910, before the Treaty of Fes in 1912, which officially established the French Protectorate. This original tower was one of the first things built by the French colonists in Casablanca and in Morocco. It reached a height of 30 meters, like another built under Dessigny's command in Aïn Séfra in the Algerian Atlas Mountains when he was stationed there.

The clock tower carried great symbolic significance, as it was a symbol of French power and the dawning of a new order.

The original tower was demolished in 1948 due to its precarious condition. It was then rebuilt near the original location in 1993, with the same design.

Description 

The tower imitates the form of a minaret, and like most Moroccan minarets, the tower is square-based. The tower features 4 round mechanical clock faces, one on each side of the tower. The numbers on these clock faces are in Roman numerals.

References 

Clock towers
All stub articles
Buildings and structures in Casablanca